The 2007 Asian Cycling Championships took place at the Bangkok and Nakhon Ratchasima, Thailand from 3 to 10 September 2007.

Medal summary

Road

Men

Women

Track

Men

Women

Medal table

References
 Results

Asia
Asia
Cycling
Asian Cycling Championships
International cycle races hosted by Thailand